Siân (also Sian, Shân, Shahn;) is a Welsh feminine given name, equivalent to the English Jane, Scottish Sheena or Irish Siobhán. It is ultimately derived from the Hebrew name יְהוֹחָנָן (Yəhôḥānān), meaning “Yahweh is merciful”.

List of people with the name
Sian Barbara Allen (born 1946), American film and television actress
Siân Berry (born 1974), Green Party politician
Sian Beilock (born 1976), American scientist
Sian Blake (1972–2015), British actress
Sian Brooke (born 1980), British actress
Siân Busby (1960–2012), British writer
Sian Clifford (born 1982), English actress
Shân Cothi (born 1965), Welsh singer
Sian Eleri Welsh radio presenter
Sian Elias (born 1949), Chief Justice of New Zealand
Sian Evans (born 1971), Welsh singer with Kosheen
Sian Gibson (born 1976), Welsh comedian
Sian Harries, Welsh writer and actor
Sian Heder (born 1977), American filmmaker
Sian James (disambiguation)
Sian Kingi (1974–1987), New Zealand Australian murder victim
Siân Lloyd (born 1958), British weather presenter
Sian Massey-Ellis (born 1985), English football official
Sian O'Callaghan (1988–2011), English murder victim
Siân Phillips (born 1933), Welsh actress
Siân Reeves (born 1966), British actress
Sian Reese-Williams (born 1981), Welsh actress
Sian Williams (born 1964), BBC journalist and current affairs presenter

Fictional characters
Sian Diamond in the British drama series Waterloo Road
Sian Powers in the British soap opera Coronation Street
Siân, character in Jacqueline Wilson's The Illustrated Mum

See also
Shon (given name) / Shôn (Welsh variant)

References

Welsh feminine given names
Feminine given names